Carl Richard Brubaker (born January 2, 1932) is a former American football player who played with the Buffalo Bills and Chicago Cardinals. He played college football at Ohio Wesleyan University and Ohio State University.

References

1932 births
Living people
American football ends
Ohio Wesleyan Battling Bishops football players
Ohio State Buckeyes football players
Chicago Cardinals players
Buffalo Bills players
Players of American football from Cleveland
American Football League players